Shams Pahlavi (– ) was an Iranian royal of the Pahlavi dynasty, who was the elder sister of Mohammad Reza Pahlavi, the last Shah of Iran. During her brother's reign she was the president of the Red Lion and Sun Society.

Biography
Pahlavi was born in Tehran on 28 October 1917. She was the elder daughter of Reza Shah and his consort Tadj ol-Molouk.

When the Second Eastern Women's Congress was arranged in Tehran in 1932, Shams Pahlavi served as its president and Sediqeh Dowlatabadi as its secretary.

On 8 January 1936, she and her mother and sister, Ashraf, played a major symbolic role in the Kashf-e hijab (the abolition of the veil) which was a part of the shah's effort to include women in public society, by participating in the graduation ceremony of the Tehran Teacher's College unveiled.

Shams Pahlavi married Fereydoun Djam, son of then-prime minister of Iran Mahmoud Djam, under strict orders from her father in 1937, but the marriage was unhappy, and the couple divorced immediately after the death of Reza Shah.

Following the deposition of Reza Shah after the Anglo-Soviet invasion of Iran in 1941, Shams and her husband accompanied her father during his exile to Port Louis, Mauritius, and later Johannesburg, South Africa. She published her memoir of this trip in monthly installments in the Ettela'at newspaper in 1948.

She was deprived of her ranks and titles for a brief period of time after her second marriage to Mehrdad Pahlbod, and lived in the United States from 1945 to 1947. Later, a reconciliation with the court was achieved and the couple returned to Tehran only to leave again during the upheavals of the Abadan Crisis. She converted to Catholicism in the 1940s. Princess Shams was persuaded to convert by Ernest Perron, the best friend of the Shah. Her husband and children adopted Catholicism after her.

After returning to Iran following the 1953 coup which re-established the rule of her brother, she maintained a low public profile, contrary to that of her sister Princess Ashraf Pahlavi, and confined her activities to the management of the vast fortune she inherited from her father.

In the late 1960s, she commissioned the Frank Lloyd Wright Foundation architects to build her the Morvarid Palace in Mehrshahr near Karaj, and Villa Mehrafarin in Chalous, Mazandaran.

She left Iran for the United States after the Islamic Revolution and died of cancer on her Santa Barbara estate in 1996.

Honours 
Order of the Pleiades (Neshaan-e haft peikar), 2nd Class, (1957, Iran)
Order of Aryamehr (Neshān-e Āryāmehr), 2nd Class, (26 September 1967, Iran)

References

External links

 Picture of a young Princess Shams Pahlavi

20th-century Iranian women
20th-century Roman Catholics
1917 births
1996 deaths
Exiles of the Iranian Revolution in the United States
Pahlavi princesses
Mohammad Reza Pahlavi
People of the Iranian Revolution
Grand Cordons of the Order of the Precious Crown
Red Cross personnel
Iranian former Shia Muslims
Middle Eastern Christians
Converts to Roman Catholicism from Shia Islam
Iranian Roman Catholics
People from Tehran
Mazandarani people
Burials at Santa Barbara Cemetery